Merseburg was a Verwaltungsgemeinschaft ("collective municipality") in the Saalekreis district, in Saxony-Anhalt, Germany. The seat of the Verwaltungsgemeinschaft was in Merseburg. It was disbanded on 1 January 2010.

The Verwaltungsgemeinschaft Merseburg consisted of the following municipalities:
 Geusa 
 Merseburg

References

Former Verwaltungsgemeinschaften in Saxony-Anhalt
Merseburg